The Finnish national beach soccer team represents Finland in international beach soccer competitions and is controlled by the SPL, the governing body for football in Finland. The team was formed in 2009.

Current squad
Correct as of 27 June 2009

Match history

References

European national beach soccer teams
Beach soccer in Finland
Beach soccer